The BMW R68 is a  sport version of the pre-1955 BMW motorcycles.  A total of 1,452 models were manufactured from 1952 to 1954, making it one of BMW's rarest production motorcycles.

History
In October 1951, at the German International Motorcycle Show in Frankfurt, BMW displayed a new high performance model. The machine had improved performance of  compared to the low-compression R67/2, a racing-type magneto, bigger bore 26 mm Bing carburetors  and improved twin leading-shoe front brake. It also came with a more modern sporty narrow front fender rather than the deeply valanced fender used on other BMW twins. BMW announced the R68 as "The first 100 mph motorcycle." A separate pillion pad resembled a passenger saddle, but was provided for the rider to slide backward in order to crouch low for higher speeds.

For the 1954 model year, BMW introduced full-width brakes on the R68.  Previously they had half-width brakes. 

In the photo to the left are some of the unusual elements of the rear part of the R68.  Note the exposed, hard chrome drive shaft connecting the rear drive on the left with the rear of the transmission on the right.  A plunger attached to the rear drive limits vertical movement so the front of the drive shaft is connected to the transmission with a round rubber puck with holes to receive the drive shaft's attachment plate.

The hand-operated tire pump held under the frame has a swing-out lever so the rider can hold it down with his foot, unlike later BMW tire pumps.

The rider's saddle is suspended with a large chrome plated spring and is connected directly to the rear saddle so the rider can slide backward and crouch at higher speeds.  Rear foot pegs were normally included for the rider to use when sliding on the rear saddle to crouch for high speeds.

The short vertical handle on the side of the transmission is often referred to as a mechanic's shifter.

A 1954 R68 restored by Tim Stafford of San Diego took second place among German motorcycles at the 2012 Pebble Beach Concours d'Elegance.

See also
 History of BMW motorcycles
 BMW R51/3
List of motorcycles of the 1950s

References

Citations

Sources
Books

Websites

R68
Motorcycles powered by flat engines
Shaft drive motorcycles
Motorcycles introduced in the 1950s